The 2003–04 Butler Bulldogs men's basketball team represented Butler University in the 2003–04 NCAA Division I men's basketball season. Their head coach was Todd Lickliter, serving his 3rd year. The Bulldogs played their home games at Hinkle Fieldhouse.

Roster

Schedule and results

|-
!colspan=9 style="background:#13294B; color:#FFFFFF;"| Regular season

|-
!colspan=9 style="background:#13294B; color:#FFFFFF;"| Horizon League tournament

References

Butler
Butler Bulldogs men's basketball seasons
Butler Bulldogs men's basketball
Butler Bulldogs men's basketball